Uramya pristis is a species of fly in the genus Uramya of the family Tachinidae.

Distribution
Mexico, Bolivia, Bolivia, Brazil, Paraguay.

References

Insects described in 1849
Dexiinae
Diptera of South America
Diptera of North America
Taxa named by Francis Walker (entomologist)